Eamonn Vines (born 17 January 1994) is an Australian cricketer. He made his first-class debut on 8 February 2018 for Victoria against South Australia during the 2017–18 Sheffield Shield season.

References

1994 births
Victoria cricketers
Australian cricketers
Living people